In arithmetic, Euclidean division – or division with remainder – is the process of dividing one integer (the dividend) by another (the divisor), in a way that produces an integer quotient and a natural number remainder strictly smaller than the absolute value of the divisor. A fundamental property     is that the quotient and the remainder exist and are unique, under some conditions. Because of this uniqueness, Euclidean division is often considered without referring to any method of computation, and without explicitly computing the quotient and the remainder. The methods of computation are called integer division algorithms, the best known of which being long division.

Euclidean division, and algorithms to compute it, are fundamental for many questions concerning integers, such as the Euclidean algorithm for finding the greatest common divisor of two integers, and modular arithmetic, for which only remainders are considered. The operation consisting of computing only the remainder is called the modulo operation, and is used often in both mathematics and computer science.

Division theorem

Euclidean division is based on the following result, which is sometimes called Euclid's division lemma.

 
and 
, 

The computation of the quotient and the remainder from the dividend and the divisor is called , or in case of ambiguity, .

Division is not defined in the case where ; see division by zero.

History

Although "Euclidean division" is named after Euclid, it seems that he did not know the existence and uniqueness theorem, and that the only computation method that he knew was the division by repeated subtraction.

Before the discovery of Hindu–Arabic numeral system, which was introduced in Europe during the 13th century by Fibonacci, division was extremely difficult, and only the best mathematicians were able to do it. Presently, most division algorithms, including long division, are based on this notation or its variants, such as binary numerals. A notable exception is Newton–Raphson division, which is independent from any numeral system.

The term "Euclidean division" was introduced during the 20th century as a shorthand for "division of Euclidean rings". It has been rapidly adopted by mathematicians for distinguishing this division from the other kinds of division of numbers.

Intuitive example
Suppose that a pie has 9 slices and they are to be divided evenly among 4 people. Using Euclidean division, 9 divided by 4 is 2 with remainder 1. In other words, each person receives 2 slices of pie, and there is 1 slice left over.

This can be confirmed using multiplication, the inverse of division: if each of the 4 people received 2 slices, then 4 × 2 = 8 slices were given out in total. Adding the 1 slice remaining, the result is 9 slices. In summary: 9 = 4 × 2 + 1.

In general, if the number of slices is denoted  and the number of people is denoted , then one can divide the pie evenly among the people such that each person receives  slices (the quotient), with some number of slices  being the leftover (the remainder). In which case, the equation  holds.

If 9 slices were divided among 3 people instead of 4, then each would receive 3 and no slice would be left over, which means that the remainder would be zero, leading to the conclusion that 3 evenly divides 9, or that 3 divides 9.

Euclidean division can also be extended to negative dividend (or negative divisor) using the same formula; for example −9 = 4 × (−3) + 3, which means that −9 divided by 4 is −3 with remainder 3.

Examples 

If a = 7 and b = 3, then q = 2 and r = 1, since 7 = 3 × 2 + 1.
If a = 7 and b = −3, then q = −2 and r = 1, since 7 = −3 × (−2) + 1.
If a = −7 and b = 3, then q = −3 and r = 2, since −7 = 3 × (−3) + 2.
If a = −7 and b = −3, then q = 3 and r = 2, since −7 = −3 × 3 + 2.

Proof
The following proof of the division theorem relies on the fact that a decreasing sequence of non-negative integers stops eventually. Other proofs use the well-ordering principle (i.e., the assertion that every non-empty set of non-negative integers has a smallest element) to make the reasoning simpler, but have the disadvantage of not providing directly an algorithm for solving the division (see  for more).

Existence

Consider first the case . This reduces the existence for the case  to that of the case .

Thus the proof of the existence is reduced to the case  and  — which will be considered in the remainder of the proof.

If  then the division is complete, so suppose .

This proves the existence and also gives a simple division algorithm for computing the quotient and the remainder.

Uniqueness
The pair of integers  and  such that  is unique, in the sense that there can be no other pair of integers that satisfy the same condition in the Euclidean division theorem.

.

To prove this statement, we first start with the assumptions that

 
 
 
 

Subtracting the two equations yields
.
As 

by the above inequalities, one gets 
,
and 
.

 Effectiveness 
In general, an existence proof does not provide an algorithm for computing the existing quotient and remainder, but the above proof does immediately provide an algorithm (see Division algorithm#Division by repeated subtraction), even though it is not a very efficient one as it requires as many steps as the size of the quotient. This is related to the fact that it uses only additions, subtractions and comparisons of integers, without involving multiplication, nor any particular representation of the integers such as decimal notation.

In terms of decimal notation, long division provides a much more efficient algorithm for solving Euclidean divisions. Its generalization to binary and hexadecimal notation provides further flexibility and possibility for computer implementation. However, for large inputs, algorithms that reduce division to multiplication, such as Newton–Raphson, are usually preferred, because they only need a time which is proportional to the time of the multiplication needed to verify the result—independently of the multiplication algorithm which is used (for more, see Division algorithm#Fast division methods).

 Variants 

The Euclidean division admits a number of variants, some of which are listed below.

 Other intervals for the remainder 

Any other interval of the same length may be used.

In particular, if  then  . This division is called the centered division, and its remainder  is called the centered remainder or the least absolute remainder''.

This is used for approximating real numbers: Euclidean division defines truncation, and centered division defines rounding.

 Montgomery division 

This result generalizes Hensel's odd division (1900).

The value  is the -residue defined in Montgomery reduction.

In Euclidean domains

Euclidean domains (also known as Euclidean rings) are defined as integral domains which support the following generalization of Euclidean division:

It occurs only in exceptional cases, typically for univariate polynomials, and for integers, if the further condition  is added.

Examples of Euclidean domains include fields, polynomial rings in one variable over a field, and the Gaussian integers. The Euclidean division of polynomials has been the object of specific developments.

See also 
 Euclid's lemma
 Euclidean algorithm

Notes

References
 
 

Articles containing proofs
Division (mathematics)